Lanxi may refer to the following locations in China:

Lanxi, Zhejiang, county-level city of Jinhua
Lanxi County, Suihua, Heilongjiang
Lanxi, Heilongjiang (zh), town in and seat of Lanxi County
Lanxi, Fujian (zh), town in and subdivision of Shanghang County
Lanxi, Yiyang (zh), a town in Heshan District, Yiyang, Hunan
Lanxi, Hubei (zh), subdivision of Xishui County, Hubei 
Lanxi Yao Ethnic Township (zh), subdivision of Jiangyong County, Hunan